This is a list of films produced and released by National Geographic under their feature Documentary Films banner, established in 2017. National Geographic Partners is a joint venture between The Walt Disney Company and National Geographic Society, initially established between 21st Century Fox and the National Geographic Society until Disney's acquisition of Fox's media assets on March 20, 2019.

References

National Geographic
National Geographic